Mykola Serhiyovych Kravchenko (20 May 198314 March 2022) was a Ukrainian public and political figure, chief ideologue of the far-right Azov Battalion and one of the founders of the Ukrainian ultranationalist organization Patriot of Ukraine. He also served as the deputy leader of the far-right National Corps party.

As veteran of the Russo-Ukrainian War, he was killed by Russian Armed Forces in the Battle of Kyiv on 14 March 2022 during the Russian invasion of Ukraine.

References

Literature 
 

1983 births
2022 deaths
People of the National Guard of Ukraine
Pro-Ukrainian people of the war in Donbas
Ukrainian military personnel of the war in Donbas
Ukrainian military personnel killed in the 2022 Russian invasion of Ukraine
Ukrainian anti-communists
Ukrainian neo-Nazis
Ukrainian nationalists
Wikipedia people
People from Kharkiv Oblast